Gudme is a town in central Denmark with a population of 907 (1 January 2022), located in Svendborg municipality on the island of Funen in Region of Southern Denmark. Until 1 January 2007, it was the site of the municipal council of the now former Gudme municipality.

History
Gudme was an important site during the Iron Age. Numerous archeological finds dating from the 3rd to the 6th century have been made here; they include large amounts of gold treasure and the remains of what is assumed to have been a royal palace. Bracteates were produced at the site during that period, indicating a shamanic culture in Gudme. The name of the town means "gods' home", leading to the assumption that it was an important religious site as well.

Notable people 
 Hannibal Sehested (1842 in Gudme – 1924) a Danish landowner and Council President (Denmark) 1900/1901

References

External links
Svendborg municipality

Cities and towns in the Region of Southern Denmark
Archaeological sites in Denmark
Svendborg Municipality
Populated places in Funen